The fourth-generation Jaguar XJ is a saloon car built by British manufacturer Jaguar Cars, later known as Jaguar Land Rover, from 2010 to 2019. Referred to internally within Jaguar as the X351, it was announced in 2009,before going on sale in 2010, and combines revised styling with underpinnings of the previous X350 generation. The model was discontinued in 2019.  it is the final generation of the Jaguar XJ.

Overview

Jaguar invited Jay Leno to unveil the new XJ during the launch at the Saatchi Gallery in London on 9 July 2009. The event was broadcast live on the Jaguar website. The US model was unveiled at the 2009 Pebble Beach Concours d'Elegance.

Production of the car was due to begin in September 2009, with first deliveries being made in early 2010. Production later began in 2010, with the car arriving in dealer showrooms in May 2010. Production was initially carried out only at the Castle Bromwich Assembly plant in Birmingham, England. From 2014, assembly from complete knockdown kits (CKD) of the XJ commenced at Jaguar Land Rover's facility in Pune, India.

Design
The XJ was designed at Jaguar Land Rover's Whitley plant in Coventry, by a team led by design director Ian Callum. Design work began in 2005, with final design approval taking place in November 2006 and the design being frozen in the first half of 2008.
The new design is a complete departure from any earlier XJ model, although mechanically the car is a development of its predecessor.

Models 
In addition to the standard version with a  wheelbase, a long-wheelbase version was available with a  wheelbase. At the 2010 Moscow Motor Show, a high security version of the car called the XJ Sentinel was introduced. This is an armoured version of Long Wheelbase XJ with B7-level ballistic protection as well as providing protection against 15 kg TNT or equivalent explosive.

However, unlike other full-size flagship executive cars, the long-wheelbase variant was designed first and was expected to make up 67 percent of sales in the United States market.

Engines
The engine used by the X351 are enlarged and upgraded versions of the previously used V8 petrol and V6 diesel engines.

Transmission and top speed
All 2010 models of the Jaguar XJ include standard six-speed automatic transmission with Jaguar Sequential Shift carried over from the X350, the main change being steering wheel shift paddles rather than the "J" gate gear selector. An eight speed automatic transmission was introduced from 2013 onwards.

Chassis
The XJ features a lightweight aluminium floorpan and body (with 50% recycled material content) based on the X350 chassis and retaining a proportion of the earlier floor pan. The biggest change is reversion to steel coil springs for the front suspension, retaining air suspension for the rear only. Continuously variable damping is electronically controlled as before but with driver selectable modes.

Equipment
Driver information and entertainment is provided by a Bowers & Wilkins 1,200-watt, 20-speaker Dolby 7.1 surround-sound system
and a bi-directional touch screen display - on which the driver can only see the vehicle functions (and satellite navigation data), but a front passenger can simultaneously view a DVD movie or a television transmission. Standard equipment levels on the United States-spec XJ L with the base engine includes a panoramic dual-pane moonroof, lane-departure warning, navigation, quad-zone climate control and power sunshades, which is considered to be generous at this price point compared to other flagship executive saloons.

Fuel economy and emissions

Special uses
On 11 May 2010, the British Prime Minister, David Cameron, took delivery of the dark grey (car No. 10) of Jaguar XJ Sentinel as his official transport. In 2011, David Cameron took the delivery of another XJ Sentinel featuring "bomb proof" doors, bullet proof glass and armoured plating beneath the floor of the car, respectively replacing the previous XJ Sentinel. The car was used for transporting the former British Prime Minister Theresa May, and was also used by the former Prime Minister Boris Johnson.

Model year changes

2011
New options include:
New Rear Seat Comfort package, which incorporates electric recline, lumbar adjustment and massage functions to reinforce the ultimate executive limousine experience.
Executive Pack option is added to XJL Portfolio model, which includes provision of fold-down laptop trays and an electric rear sunblind, upgraded carpeting, combination wood and leather steering wheel, gloss wood veneer choices and chrome mirror housings.
Sport and Speed Pack option, which includes a new front splitter and rear spoiler, suede headliner, sport seats with contrasting stitching, bright metal pedals, either piano black or carbon-fiber interior trim, gloss black exterior trim, red brake calipers, and Venom 20-inch wheel design.
Illumination Package (standard on Supersport model) is available as option of other XJ models.
3.0-litre petrol V6 engine for selected markets, launched in China.

XJ 5.0 V8 Portfolio Prestige
The XJ V8 Portfolio Prestige is a special model developed for the Hong Kong market.
Based on XJ L Portfolio with a 5.0-litre V8 engine, it includes XJ rear seat comfort pack and gloss oak interior veneer as standard equipment.

XJ Ultimate
The XJ Ultimate is a special model introduced in 2011. Available only in the long wheelbase configuration, the car was developed by the Jaguar Land Rover's specialist Engineered To Order (ETO) division and was unveiled at the 2012 Beijing Auto Show.

The XJ went on sale in late 2012 as 2013 model year vehicle.

In India, the XJ Ultimate is available with a 5.0-litre V8 petrol engine that costs  or with a 3.0-litre V6 turbocharged diesel engine that costs .

2012
Changes include:

Introduction of a 3.0-litre supercharged V6 engine
Eight-speed automatic transmission for all models.
Jaguar's Intelligent Stop/Start system extended to all V6 and V8 petrol and all diesel engines.
The supercharged V8 petrol engine has fuel economy gains of up to 11% with emissions reductions of more than 8%, while the naturally-aspirated V8 sees economy improvements of up to 8% with emissions down by more than 6%.
Optional sound systems developed by British ultra-premium specialist Meridian. Available in two power outputs - 380 W and 825 W - both featuring multiple channel amplifiers and digital signal processing software powering an array of loudspeakers.
Infotainment system updates enhance the audio and navigation interfaces and usability.
Suspension enhancements to the XJ further optimise passenger comfort.

XJR (2013–2019)

Introduced in 2013, the XJR is a high performance variant of the XJ.

The XJR was initially unveiled at 2013 New York Auto Show, followed by the 2013 Goodwood Festival of Speed. The US model went on sale as 2014 model year vehicle.

Transmissions
All models include ZF 8HP eight-speed automatic transmission.

2014

2015

The XJ received a facelift in 2015. Changes include LED front and rear lights, rear J-Blade lights, a new grille, and a new InControl Touch Pro infotainment system, new driver assistance technology and a new audio system.

Discontinuation
On 30 May 2019, Autocar reported that Jaguar would discontinue the current XJ in July 2019, partly to make way for a new flagship electric XJ planned to be built at Castle Bromwich. The article mentioned that despite its status it was Jaguar's least popular model, selling 301 in September 2018 compared with 4492 F Pace SUVs and 2252 XE saloons. In February 2021, it was announced that the electric XJ successor was also cancelled for the present.

References

External links

Jaguar pages: XJ , XJ Sentinel 
Official Jaguar XJ (X351) media website 
XJ X351 eBrochure: 2009 ,  2011 , 2012 
Media kits: XJ, 2011, 2012

XJ4
Sports sedans
Flagship vehicles
Full-size vehicles
Rear-wheel-drive vehicles
Cars introduced in 2010
2010s cars